The 1909 Canadian football season was the 18th season of organized play since the Canadian Rugby Union (CRU) was founded in 1892 and the 26th season since the creation of the founding leagues, the Ontario Rugby Football Union (ORFU) and the Quebec Rugby Football Union (QRFU) in 1883. The season concluded with Toronto Varsity defeating Toronto Parkdale in the 1909 Dominion Championship game. This year was notable for being the first year that the champions were awarded the Grey Cup trophy, although it was not delivered to the University of Toronto until March 1910.

Canadian football news in 1909
Lord Earl Grey, the Governor General of Canada, donated a trophy to be awarded for the Dominion Football Championship of Canada. Only teams registered with the Canadian Rugby Union were eligible to compete for the trophy. The championship game was played in Toronto at Rosedale Field on December 4 between the University of Toronto and the Toronto Parkdale Canoe Club with the University of Toronto winning 26–6 before 3,807 fans. Hugh Gall kicked a record eight singles in the game for the U of T. The gross revenue was $2,616.40.

On December 11, following an invitation from the New York Herald newspaper, the Hamilton Tigers and Ottawa Rough Riders played an exhibition game of Canadian football in New York City at Van Cortland Park. The Tigers won 11–6 before 15,000 fans.

Saskatchewan Rugby Football League did not play in 1909.

Regular season

Final regular season standings
Note: GP = Games Played, W = Wins, L = Losses, T = Ties, PF = Points For, PA = Points Against, Pts = Points
*Bold text means that they have clinched the playoffs

League Champions

Grey Cup Playoffs
Note: All dates in 1909

Alberta Rugby Football League Playoffs

Calgary wins the total-point series 48-7.

IRFU Playoff

Ottawa advances to the East Semi-Final.

ORFU Playoff

Toronto Parkdale advances to the Grey Cup.

Dominion Semi-Final

Toronto Varsity advances to the Grey Cup.

Playoff Bracket

Grey Cup Championship

References

 
Canadian Football League seasons